František Čermák (born 14 November 1976) is a Czech retired tennis player.

Career
In his career, Čermák won 31 doubles titles on the ATP Tour and he was a finalist 24 times. He achieved a career-high doubles ranking of world No. 14 in February 2010, and he usually played doubles with Filip Polášek.

In mixed doubles, Čermák and partner Lucie Hradecká reached the final of the 2013 Australian Open and won the 2013 French Open.

In singles, he won one Challenger title and ten Futures titles, reaching a career-high singles ranking of world No. 201 in October 2003.

Davis Cup
Čermák was a member of the winning Czech Republic team in the 2012 Davis Cup. He coached countrywoman Petra Kvitová from April 2016 to the 2016 US Open. He is currently the coach of Czech player Kristýna Plíšková.

Grand Slam finals

Mixed doubles: 2 (1 title, 1 runner-up)

ATP career finals

Doubles: 55 (31 titles, 24 runner-ups)

Doubles performance timeline

External links

 
 
 

1976 births
Living people
People from Valtice
Czech male tennis players
Czech tennis coaches
French Open champions
Grand Slam (tennis) champions in mixed doubles
Sportspeople from the South Moravian Region